Senate elections were held in Turkey on 7 June 1964. In this election 51 members of the Senate were elected; 50 members for one-third of the Senate and one vacant seat.

Results

References

Turkey
Turkey
Senate
Senate elections in Turkey